Coelioxys dolichos is a species of bee in the family Megachilidae.

References

Further reading

 

dolichos
Articles created by Qbugbot
Insects described in 1890